The GE C36-7 is a 6-axle diesel-electric locomotive built by GE Transportation Systems, GE do Brazil and A Goninan & Co between 1978 and 1989. It is an updated GE U36C with a 16-cylinder FDL engine. It is externally similar to the GE C30-7 but has larger air intakes under the radiators. The dynamic brakes grids of later units are located in a high box behind the cab. C36-7s were constructed with either 3,600 or 3,750 hp.

Production History 
599 examples of this locomotive were built, 422 of which were exported to the People's Republic of China, where it is designated as the China Railways ND5. GE do Brazil built 15 C36-7s for Ferrocarriles Nacionales de México, numbers 9327–9341. The three Hamersley Iron units built by A Goninan & Co were exported to the United States in the late 1990s after being withdrawn from service in Australia and were later sold to various railway companies. In 2003, 58 former Missouri Pacific units acquired by Union Pacific were exported to Estonia for Eesti Raudtee, alongside 19 C30-7s from Norfolk Southern and CSX.

Original owners

References

External links
 
 

C-C locomotives
Diesel-electric locomotives of China
Diesel-electric locomotives of the United States
Diesel locomotives of Western Australia
Freight locomotives
C36-7
Railway locomotives introduced in 1978
Standard gauge locomotives of the United States
Standard gauge locomotives of Mexico
Standard gauge locomotives of China
Standard gauge locomotives of Australia
Diesel-electric locomotives of Mexico
Diesel-electric locomotives of Australia